Marcus Smith II (born March 31, 1992) is a former American football outside linebacker. He was drafted by the Philadelphia Eagles in the first round of the 2014 NFL Draft, and played college football at Louisville.

High school
Smith attended Hardaway High School in Columbus, Georgia. He played quarterback for Hardaway, passing for more than 1,800 yards and 14 touchdowns, while adding 227 yards rushing and four touchdowns. As a senior, he was selected to the 2009 AAAA All-Region Second-team.

He was considered a three-star recruit by Rivals.com.

College career
Smith attended the University of Louisville from 2010 to 2013.

As a senior in 2013, he recorded 42 tackles, including 18.5 for loss, and 14.5 sacks, which was second nationally. He was named a third-team All-American by the Associated Press. He was also a first-team All-AAC and was named the conference's Defensive Player of the Year.

Professional career

Philadelphia Eagles
Smith was selected 26th overall, by the Philadelphia Eagles in the first round of the 2014 NFL Draft.

In the 2014 season, Smith was on the field for eight of the team's 16 games. On May 1, 2017, the Eagles declined to exercise the fifth-year option on Smith's contract.

On July 26, 2017, Smith was waived by the Eagles.

Seattle Seahawks
On July 28, 2017, Smith signed with the Seattle Seahawks.

On October 1, 2017, after Cliff Avril suffered a neck injury against the Indianapolis Colts, Smith was forced into the starting defensive line rotation early in the game. He responded with the finest game of his career, recording 1.5 sacks and 1 forced fumble on Colts QB Jacoby Brissett.

On March 22, 2018, Smith re-signed with the Seahawks. He was released on August 17, 2018.

Washington Redskins
On December 4, 2018, Smith signed with the Washington Redskins, but was waived on December 15, 2018. He was re-signed on December 27, 2018. 

Smith was waived on August 31, 2019 for final roster cuts before the start of the 2019 season.

Literature 
On December 2, 2020, Smith released a children's book titled Bathtime with Rai.

References

External links
Philadelphia Eagles bio
Louisville Cardinals bio

1992 births
Living people
Players of American football from Columbus, Georgia
American football defensive ends
Louisville Cardinals football players
Philadelphia Eagles players
Seattle Seahawks players
Washington Redskins players
American football outside linebackers